Steel Rose is a fantasy novel by the American writer Kara Dalkey.

Set in 1990s Pittsburgh, Pennsylvania, it tells the story of T.J. Kaminski, a performance artist who is desperate to jumpstart her career. In a secret corner of Schenley Park, she conjures up elves with the power to grant her wish. But when Kaminski picks up the strange rose one of them tosses on stage, she unwittingly steps into a battle between immortal foes.

References

1997 American novels
American fantasy novels
Novels about artists
Novels set in Pittsburgh